Dean Patrick Caliguire (born March 2, 1967) is a former American football offensive lineman who played three seasons in the National Football League (NFL) with the Pittsburgh Steelers and San Francisco 49ers. He was drafted by the 49ers in the fourth round of the 1990 NFL Draft. He played college football at the University of Pittsburgh and attended Montour High School in McKees Rocks, Pennsylvania. Caliguire was also a member of the New England Patriots.

College career
Caliguire played for the Pittsburgh Panthers from 1985 to 1989, earning Associated Press All-East team honors.

Professional career

San Francisco 49ers
Caliguire was selected by the San Francisco 49ers of the NFL with the 92nd pick in the 1990 NFL Draft and signed with the team on July 29, 1990. He spent the 1990 season on injured reserve. He played in two games for the 49ers in 1991. Caliguire was released by the 49ers on September 28, 1991.

Pittsburgh Steelers
On October 5, 1991, Caliguire was signed to the practice squad of the Pittsburgh Steelers of the NFL. He was promoted to the active roster on October 18, 1991. He played in seven games for the Steelers during the 1991 season. Caliguire was released by the Steelers on August 31, 1992. He signed with the Steelers on September 15, 1992. He was released by the Steelers on November 3, 1992.

New England Patriots
Caliguire signed with the NFL's New England Patriots on February 17, 1993. He was released by the Patriots on June 3, 1993.

References

External links
Just Sports Stats
Fanbase profile

Living people
1967 births
American football offensive linemen
Pittsburgh Panthers football players
Pittsburgh Steelers players
San Francisco 49ers players
New England Patriots players
Players of American football from Pittsburgh